Hrubeš a Mareš jsou kamarádi do deště  is a Czech comedy film directed by Vladimír Morávek. It was released in 2005.

Cast
 Jan Budař - Václav Hrubes
 Richard Krajčo - Josef Mares
 Miroslav Donutil - Václav Hrubes senior
 Iva Janžurová - Lída Hrubesová
 Magdaléna Borová - Irena Hajícková
 Robert Roth - Robert Karpatti
 Simona Peková - Simona Speková
 Stella Zázvorková - Miriam Maresová
 Radovan Lukavský - Josef Mares
 Ester Kočičková - Ester Kotrlá
 Filip Rajmont - Kamil
 Pavla Tomicová - Carmen Bohunská

External links
 

2005 films
2005 comedy films
Czech comedy films
2000s Czech films